This is a list of lighthouses in Yemen.

Lighthouses

See also
 Lists of lighthouses and lightvessels

References

External links

 

Yemen
Lighthouses
Lighthouses